The Mabuhay Singers were a group of singers from the Philippines that was formed in 1958. Some of the members went on to become soloists like Cely Bautista, Raye Lucero, Naning Alba, and the late Rene Evangelista, among many others.

The group was formed by the Villar Recording Company as a merged group from two vocal trios, namely Tres Rosas, composed of Carmen Camacho, Nora Hermosa, and Raye Lucero; and the Lovers Trio, composed of Chi Lucerio, Floro San Juan, and Ador Torres. Filipino singers like Ruben Tagalog, Cely Bautista, Ric Manrique, Jr., Rita Rivera, Don David, Flor Ocampo, Noel Samonte, Betty Rivera, Phil Llamas, Robert Malaga, and Everlita Rivera joined the group briefly.

The Mabuhay Singers recorded more than 100 albums; some were released internationally. The albums contained traditional and modern Filipino music in major languages of the Philippines, and some songs in English and Spanish. In 1973, the Philippine Records Association awarded a citation for the group for their best-selling albums. The Christmas song "Mano Po Ninong! Mano Po Ninang!", co-written by Torres, was originally recorded by the group.

Discography
Halina't Umawit (1962)
Maligayang Araw (1963)
Bakasyon (1968)
Mabuhay Singers Sings Pandangguhan, Dahil sa Iyo and Other Philippine Songs (1968)
Perlas ng Silangan (1971)
Sariling Awit (1971)
Kami Po'y Paskuhan (1973)

Awards

References

Filipino pop music groups
Filipino choirs
Musical groups established in 1958
1958 establishments in the Philippines